Vladimir Ivanovich Msryan (12 March 1938 – 24 August 2010) was an  Armenian stage and film actor.

Msryan was born in Vladikavkaz, North Ossetia-Alania. From 1958–62, he studied drama at the Yerevan Fine Arts and Theater Institute. He performed at the Yerevan Drama Theater from 1966 onwards. Aside from Armenian films he also appeared in such non-Armenian films as Sand-Storm, White Cloth, Empire of Pirates and Unburied Corpses. He may have garnered the most attention for his portrayal of Niccolò Paganini in the 1982 Soviet television miniseries.   

He starred in Smerch which was screened in the Un Certain Regard section at the 1989 Cannes Film Festival.

Death
Msryan died on August 24, 2010 in Yerevan, from the effects of leukemia. He was 72.

Filmography

References

External links
 
 Vladimir Msryan profile

1938 births
2010 deaths
Armenian male stage actors
Armenian male film actors
Russian male film actors
People from Vladikavkaz
Deaths from cancer in Armenia
Deaths from leukemia
Soviet Armenians
Russian people of Armenian descent